The 2010 Basingstoke and Deane Council election took place on 6 May 2010 to elect members of Basingstoke and Deane Borough Council in Hampshire, England. It was part of the wider English Local Elections, which were postponed from their usual date of the first Thursday of May so that they could coincide with the General Election of that year. One third of the council was up for election and the Conservative Party stayed in overall control of the council.

Background
Between the 2008 election and 2010, 2 Conservatives councillors left the party. Husband and wife Phil and Christine Heath split from the Conservatives in 2008 and formed the Basingstoke First Community Party, which would contest the 2010 election.

Election result

The results saw the Conservatives increase their majority on the council from 5 to 7 seats, after making 1 gain to have 34 councillors. They retook Kempshott, which had formerly been held by the leader of the Basingstoke First Community Party, Christine Heath. Heath did not defend the seat which she had held for the previous 7 years, instead she stood in Hatch Warren and Beggarwood ward, which was held by the Conservatives. The other parties retained all the seats they had been defending, meaning the Liberal Democrats remained on 14 seats, Labour 9 and independents 2, while the Basingstoke First Community Party was left with 1 seat which was not contested at the election. Overall turnout in the election was 67.5%.

Ward results

References

2010
2010 English local elections
May 2010 events in the United Kingdom
2010s in Hampshire